Carmen Margarita Zapata (July 15, 1927 – January 5, 2014) often referred to as "The First Lady of the Hispanic Theater" was an American actress best known for her role in the PBS bilingual children's program Villa Alegre. Zapata is also the co-founder and director of the Bilingual Foundation of the Arts in Los Angeles. Zapata took an active part in the Chicano movement of the 1960s and 1970s. Zapata was born in New York City to Julio Zapata, a Mexican immigrant, and Ramona Roca, an Argentine immigrant.

Acting career
Zapata made her Broadway debut in the chorus of Oklahoma! in 1946. She appeared in over three hundred movies and shows, including Batman: The Animated Series, Married... with Children, Sister Act, and she was Carmen Castillo in Santa Barbara. One of her longest-running roles was on the bilingual children's program Villa Alegre, where for nine years she played the lead character, "Doña Luz."

In 1972, Zapata co-founded the Screen Actors Guild Ethnic Minority Committee with actors Ricardo Montalbán, Edith Diaz, and Henry Darrow. She was also one of the original members of the Hispanic actors organization "Nosotros," which was begun by Ricardo Montalbán. In 1973, she co-founded the Bilingual Foundation of the Arts (BFA) with Cuban-born actress, playwright, and director Margarita Galban and Argentine-born award-winning set designer Estela Scarlata.

In 1976, Zapata joined Rodolfo Hoyos, Jr., in starring roles in the 12-episode ABC situation comedy summer replacement series Viva Valdez, about a Mexican-American family living in East Los Angeles, California.

In 1986, she and her writing partner, Michael Dewell, published translations for Federico García Lorca's dramatic trilogy. The title was published by Bantam Books and was part of her effort to bring Spanish language literature to English speakers.

Awards
In 1983, Zapata was honored with the Humanitarian Crystal Award from Women in Film. Zapata was also honored with a Hispanic Heritage Lifetime Achievement Award in 1997 for her career trajectory in the arts and for her work with the BFA.

Zapata was nominated for an Emmy twice in her career, once as Best Supporting Actress for her role in a segment of Medical Center and once for her role in the film Carola.

In 1981, Zapata was part of a group of greater Los Angeles women honored by the Young Women's Christian Association with the Silver Achievement Award.

In 1983, Zapata was given the Ruben Salazar Award by the Mexican American Legal Defense and Education Fund (MALDEF).

In 1985, Zapata was named Woman of the Year by the Hispanic Women's Council.

In 1986, Zapata was the recipient of the Best Translation Award from the journal Dramalogue.

Granted an honorary doctorate in human services from Sierra University.

In 1991, she was among nine Californian artists, arts organizations, and patrons to receive the Governor's Award for the Arts.

In 1999, Zapata was knighted by His Majesty Juan Carlos I, King of Spain and received El Lazo de Dama del Orden del Mérito Civil, the Civil Order of Merit.

In 2003, Zapata received a star on the Hollywood Walk of Fame.

Philanthropy
Throughout her life, Zapata was involved in various charitable events including sitting on the board of the United Way, the Mexican American Opportunity Foundation, the KCET Community Advisory Board, the Boy Scouts of America, the National Conference of Christians and Jews, the National Repertory Theatre Foundation, and member of the City of Los Angeles Mayor's Committee on the Arts, the California Arts Council's Ethnic Advisory Minority Panel, and many other organizations. She has also served as a panel member of the Expansion Arts Program of the National Endowment for the Arts, the Los Angeles Special Olympics Events Committee, and other programs. Zapata was a practicing Roman Catholic and a registered Democrat.

Death
Zapata died in Los Angeles, California on January 5, 2014, from heart disease; she was 86 years old.

Filmography

See also
List of stars on the Hollywood Walk of Fame
Bilingual Foundation of the Arts

References

External links

1927 births
2014 deaths
American film actresses
American television actresses
American actresses of Mexican descent
American people of Argentine descent
Actresses from New York City
Singers from New York City
20th-century American actresses
20th-century American singers
20th-century American women singers
New York (state) Democrats
California Democrats
American Roman Catholics
21st-century American women